Milky Way Liberation Front is a 2007 South Korean film.

Plot 
Yeong-jae is dumped by his girlfriend as he struggles writing the script for his new film. As the pressure mounts, he develops aphasia.

Cast 
 Im Ji-kyu as Yeong-jae
 Park Hyuk-kwon as Hyuk-kwon
 Seo Young-ju as Eun-ha
 Kim Bo-kyung as Eun-kyeong
 Lee Eun-sung as Eun-seong
 Yu Hyeong-geun as Kimura Rei
 Yukie Mori as Japanese actress
 Park Mi-hyeon as Delegate Choi
 Jeong Seung-gil as PD Jeong
 Oh Chang-kyeong as Byeong-gil, cinematographer
 Jang Jeong-ae as Eun-jin, sound engineer
 Andrew Sung as Overseas staff
 Jo Han-cheol as Columnist

References

External links 
  
 
 
 

2007 films
2000s adventure comedy films
South Korean adventure comedy films
Films about filmmaking
Films set in Busan
2000s Korean-language films
2007 comedy films
2000s South Korean films